Los Angeles riots may refer to:

1992 Los Angeles riots, following the acquittal of police officers accused of using excessive force against Rodney King
Watts riots, of 1965, following an arrest for drunk driving in the Watts neighborhood of Los Angeles
Zoot Suit Riots, in 1943, between Anglo servicemen stationed in the city, and Latino youths